Altenji (also Romanized as Āltenjī; also known as Āltemchī) is a village in Charuymaq-e Markazi Rural District, in the Central District of Charuymaq County, East Azerbaijan Province, Iran. At the 2006 census, its population was 19, in 5 families.

References 

Populated places in Charuymaq County